James Henry McCabe (March 21, 1870 – January 20, 1957) was an American physician, lawyer and politician from New York.

Life
He graduated from Public School No. 27 in 1886; and B.A. from Sacred Heart College, in Vineland, New Jersey, in 1891. Then he studied medicine, graduated M.D. from Long Island College Hospital in 1895, and practiced medicine in Brooklyn until 1920. McCabe was a member of the New York State Senate (5th D.) from 1901 to 1904, sitting in the 124th, 125th, 126th and 127th New York State Legislatures. He was U.S. Commissioner of the Second Judicial District from 1920 to 1927. He died on January 20, 1957, at his home at 624 Merrick Rd. in Brooklyn, "after a brief illness", and was buried at the Cemetery of the Holy Rood in Westbury, New York.

Sources
 Official New York from Cleveland to Hughes by Charles Elliott Fitch (Hurd Publishing Co., New York and Buffalo, 1911, Vol. IV; pg. 365)
 The New York Red Book by Edgar L. Murlin (1903; pg. 91)
 Obit transcribed from the Brooklyn Daily Union on January 23, 1957; at RootsWeb

1870 births
1957 deaths
Democratic Party New York (state) state senators
Politicians from Brooklyn
Physicians from New York (state)
Burials at the Cemetery of the Holy Rood